Streap is a mountain in Lochaber, Highland, Scotland. It lies on a long ridge that separates Glen Finnan from Gleann Dubh Lighe, about 5 km north-east of the village of Glenfinnan.

References

Lochaber
Marilyns of Scotland
Mountains and hills of the Northwest Highlands
Corbetts